The Jeremiah J. Yeareance House is located in Lyndhurst, Bergen County, New Jersey, United States. The house was built in 1804 and served as a residence for the teacher of River Road School. The house was added to the National Register of Historic Places on April 3, 1986.

See also 

 National Register of Historic Places listings in Bergen County, New Jersey
 Jacob W. Van Winkle House

References

Houses in Bergen County, New Jersey
Houses on the National Register of Historic Places in New Jersey
Lyndhurst, New Jersey
National Register of Historic Places in Bergen County, New Jersey
New Jersey Register of Historic Places